Eleanor's House is a short story by Willa Cather. It was first published in McClure's in October 1907.

Plot summary
Harold Forscythe and his new wife Ethel are visiting the Westfields, who live in Arques-la-Bataille. Harold admits to Harriet that he is still in mourning over his late wife. Later, he goes away as he does customarily. Ethel decides to join him at Fortuney near Pontoise, where he used to live with his late wife. Harriet will go with her. When they get there, the couple have a fight. Later however, Harriet tells her husband she is buying Harold's house in Fortuney - he is leaving for America with his wife, who is pregnant.

Characters
Mrs Harriet Westfield. She went to a convent in Paris with Eleanor in her youth.
Mr Robert Westfield
Harold Forscythe
Ethel, Harold's new wife.
Eleanor Sanford, Harold's late wife.

References to other works
Harriet mentions Antoine François Prévost's Manon Lescaut, and Alfred de Musset.

Literary significance and criticism
Eleanor's House has been deemed to be clumsily Jamesian.

References

External links
Full Text at the Willa Cather Archive

1907 short stories
Short stories by Willa Cather
Works originally published in McClure's